Maddikera is a mandal and village in Kurnool district of Andhra Pradesh, India.

Geography
Maddikera is located at the border of Kurnool district . It has an average elevation of 456 meters (1499 feet).

References

Villages in Kurnool district